Hymenocallis pygmaea Traub is a plant in the Amaryllidaceae found in the wild only in North Carolina and South Carolina. Common name is dwarf spider-lily, and it is cultivated as an ornamental in some regions.

Hymenocallis pygmaea is a bulb-forming herb found in bogs and along stream banks It is considerably smaller than most other species of Hymenocallis, with a scape rarely more the 40 cm tall. Leaves are up to 40 cm long but rarely more than 30 mm wide. The umbel contains only 1 or 2 flowers, white with a green center and a lemony scent.

References

pygmaea
Flora of North Carolina
Flora of South Carolina
Plants described in 1962